Azadabad-e Pir Dusti (also Romanized as Āzādābād-e Pīr Dūstī; also known as Āzādābād) is a village in Itivand-e Shomali Rural District, Kakavand District, Delfan County, Lorestan Province, Iran. At the 2006 census, its population was 31, in 6 families.

References 

Towns and villages in Delfan County